The 1923 Argentine Primera División was the 32nd season of top-flight football in Argentina. The AFA season began on March 11 and ended on April 27, 1924.

Boca Juniors win its 3rd league title in the official AFA league while San Lorenzo achieved its first title ever at the top division winning the AAm championship.

Asociación Argentina de Football - Copa Campeonato 

As Boca Juniors and Huracán both finished with 51 points each, they had to play a best-of-three playoff to decide a champion. Palermo, which had been relegated from the Asociación Amateur, joined Asociación Argentina remaining at Primera División. Argentino de Quilmes returned to the top division after being relegated in 1918, while All Boys, Argentino de Banfield, and Sportivo Villa Urquiza made their debuts in Primera.

Finals 
After Boca Juniors and Huracán finished tied on points, a two-legged series was established to define a champion. 

With the third match drawn on points (there was no goal difference rule), a playoff was held, finishing 0–0 after extra time so a fourth match –to be played to a finish– was required to determine a champion.

Match details

Asociación Amateurs de Football 

Argentino del Sud (promoted last year) debuted in Primera División.

Notes

References

Argentine Primera División seasons
p
p
1923 in Argentine football
1923 in South American football